HMS Paladin was a  which served with the Royal Navy during the First World War. The M class were an improvement on the previous , capable of higher speed. Launched on 27 March 1916. Paladin took part in the Royal Navy sorties against German minesweepers in 1917, which culminated in the  Second Battle of Heligoland Bight on 17 November, although the destroyer did not engage with any enemy warships during the battle. After the end of the war, the ship was placed in reserve before being decommissioned and sold to be broken up on 9 May 1921.

Design and development
Paladin was one of sixteen s ordered by the British Admiralty in February 1915 as part of the Fourth War Construction Programme. The M-class was an improved version of the earlier  destroyers, designed to reach a higher speed in order to counter rumoured German fast destroyers.

Armament consisted of three  Mk IV QF guns on the ship's centreline, with one on the forecastle, one aft on a raised platform and one between the middle and aft funnels. A single 2-pounder (40 mm) pom-pom anti-aircraft gun was carried, while torpedo armament consisted of two twin mounts for  torpedoes. The ship had a complement of 76 officers and ratings.

Construction and career
Paladin was laid down by Scotts Shipbuilding and Engineering Company of Greenock with the yard number 471 in May 1915, launched on 27 March the following year and completed on 1 May. The ship was the first to be named by the Navy after the paladin, the knights of Charlemagne. The vessel was deployed as part of the Grand Fleet, joining the Thirteenth Destroyer Flotilla.

During 1917, the Admiralty became concerned about German minesweeper activity off the Heligoland Bight. On 16 October, the destroyer sortied with the leader , but found no enemy ships. The ship subsequently formed part of the screen for the First Battle Squadron led by the dreadnought  during the Second Battle of Heligoland Bight on 17 November. The British fleet attempted to engage the light cruisers supporting the minesweepers, but were unsuccessful in sinking any of them. The destroyer remained with the destroyer screen for capital ships throughout the war, although by 1918, this was the faster battlecruisers.

After the Armistice of 11 November 1918, the Royal Navy returned to a peacetime level of mobilisation, and surplus vessels were placed in reserve. Paladin was initially transferred to Nore on 14 January 1919 until being decommissioned and sold to Thos. W. Ward in Rainham on 9 May 1921 and broken up.

Pennant numbers

Notes

References

Citations

Bibliography

 
 
 
 
 
 
 
 
 
 
 
 

1916 ships
Admiralty M-class destroyers
Ships built on the River Clyde
World War I destroyers of the United Kingdom